Paskaleva may refer to:

Katya Paskaleva (born 1945), Bulgarian film and stage actress
Tsvetana Paskaleva, Armenian journalist of Bulgarian descent

See also
Paskalev (disambiguation)